Tarlimakhi (Dargwa: Тарлимахьи) is a rural locality (a selo) in Tsudakharsky Selsoviet, Levashinsky District, Republic of Dagestan, Russia. The population was 148 as of 2010. There are 3 streets.

Geography 
Tarlimakhi is located 26 km southwest of Levashi (the district's administrative centre) by road, on the Akusha and Kazikumukhskoye Koysu Rivers. Inkuchimakhi and Gurgumakhi are the nearest rural localities.

Nationalities 
Dargins live there.

References 

Rural localities in Levashinsky District